White Oak High School is a public high school in the city of Jacksonville, North Carolina, in Onslow County, United States, and classified as a 3A school by the North Carolina High School Athletic Association.  It is  one of the seven high schools of Onslow County Schools.

History
White Oak High School opened and was accredited for the issuance of high school diplomas in August 1927. The first class graduated in the spring of 1928.  The original school was constructed off of present day Swansboro-Belgrade Road (Maysville, NC).  The school was renamed "Tabernacle" at the end of the 1969–70 school year as the "new" White Oak High School was constructed on Piney Green Road (the present day location).  Until the spring of 1970, the mascot for White Oak was the Red Devil and the colors were red and white.  When the school moved to Piney Green Road, a rising class of students selected the Viking as the new mascot and green and gold as the new colors.

Yearbooks

From 1927 to 1950, the school was without an official annual or yearbook.  During the 1950–51 school year, under the leadership of teacher Mrs. Clyde Morton Ward, the first yearbook was published.  The first edition was called "The WOHIAN".

The White Oak annual was named "The WOHian" from 1950 to 1956, the "Wee Toc" from 1957 to 1969 and the "Viking Log" from 1970 to the present day.

Principals
White Oak High School has had 17 principals since opening in 1927.  The Red Devil and Viking leaders are:
 1928–193?	A. H. Hatsell
 193?–1939	L. B. Farnell
 1939–1941	H. A. Melvin
 1941–1942	E. N. Farnell
 1942–1943	D. G. Shaw
 1943–1945	O. C. Burton
 1945–1947	B. F. Patrick
 1947–1953	C. M. Ward
 1953–1956	Howard E. Aman
 1956–1968	Allen H. Stafford (after WO, he opened Morton Elementary School)
 1968–1970	Rudolph Whaley (after WO, he remained at the same building, renamed Tabernacle; he later opened Hunters' Creek Middle)
 1970–1988	Amos Stroud (after WO, he opened Tabernacle 5th Grade Center in 1989 served as its principal for one year and retired in 1990.)
 1988–2007	Paul Wiggins (after WO, he retired and became an elected BOE member until 2020 )
 2007–2008	Megan Doyle (after WO, she became a Superintendent of Craven County Schools)
 2008–2011	Debra Bryan (after WO, she retired and became an instructional coach)
 2011–2016	Jane Dennis (after WO, she became the principal of New Bridge Middle School)
 2016–2021   Christopher Barnes (became Executive Director in Instructional Services at Central Office)
2021–present     Joycelyn Cassidy

Current motto
'We All Row!'  White Oak High School utilizes a motto based on the image of the Viking ship.  The image is prominently featured on the wall of the front hall of the school.

Athletics
The White Oak Vikings compete in the following sports: Volleyball, Cross Country, Track, Wrestling, Football, Basketball, Swimming, Golf, Tennis, Track, Softball & Baseball.

Testing summary
As of the most recent testing profile (2017), White Oak High School is ranked 47th out of 2531 schools in NC in terms of the EVAAS growth index (measuring schools for based on the amount of academic growth from one year to the next).  This puts WOHS in the top 2% of schools as measured by academic growth.

Notable alumni
 Devan Carroll, former professional soccer player
 Chad Fonville, former MLB player from 1995–1999
 Quincy Monk, former NFL player for the New York Giants and Houston Texans
 Andre Purvis, former NFL player for the Cincinnati Bengals
 Tarvis Williams, former professional basketball player

References

Public high schools in North Carolina
Schools in Onslow County, North Carolina
Educational institutions established in 1927